Homero Sartori (born March 28, 1983 in Jales, Brazil) is a Brazilian former professional footballer who played as a defender during the 2000s and 2010s, predominantly in Argentina and most notably for Club Almagro in the Argentine first division between 2001 and 2004.

Teams
 Almagro 2001–2005
 Unión de Santa Fe 2005–2006
 CAI 2006
 Comunicaciones 2007–2008
 Deportivo Morón 2008–2009
 Almirante Brown 2009–2010
 River Plate Puerto Rico 2009–2010
 Deportivo Español 2011
 Club Comunicaciones 2011–2012
 Sportivo Las Parejas 2012–2013

References

External links
 

1983 births
Living people
People from Jales
Brazilian footballers
Association football defenders
Club Almagro players
Comisión de Actividades Infantiles footballers
Deportivo Morón footballers
Unión de Santa Fe footballers
Brazilian expatriate footballers
Brazilian expatriate sportspeople in Argentina
Expatriate footballers in Argentina
Brazilian expatriate sportspeople in Puerto Rico
Expatriate footballers in Puerto Rico